Eressa naclioides is a moth of the family Erebidae. It was described by Felder in 1861. It is found in Indonesia.

References

Eressa
Moths described in 1861